Extra Ordinary is a 2019 horror comedy film written and directed by Mike Ahern and Enda Loughman. The film stars Maeve Higgins, Barry Ward, Will Forte, Claudia O'Doherty, Jamie Beamish, Terri Chandler, Risteárd Cooper and Emma Coleman. The film was released in Ireland and the United Kingdom on September 13, 2019, by Wildcard Distribution. The film was released in the United States on March 6, 2020, by Cranked Up Films, the genre division of Good Deed Entertainment.

Plot

Driving instructor Rose Dooley lives alone in Ireland. She possesses powerful paranormal "talents", including the ability to send wayward spirits into the afterlife, but has not used them since a paranormal accident killed her father, paranormal expert Vincent Dooley, when she was a child. Rose ignores obvious minor hauntings around her, and continually fends off phone calls to her driving service asking for help with paranormal problems. One of these calls is Martin Martin, who calls under the guise of wanting to learn to drive, but actually wants Rose to help him deal with the spirit of his nagging wife Bonnie, who haunts his house. Rose orders him out of her car, but not before Martin tells her he finds she has a warm presence. Meanwhile, one-hit wonder rock musician Christian Winter attempts to sacrifice a virgin woman to regain his popularity, but his wife Claudia interrupts the ritual and inadvertently kills the woman, forcing Christian to find another virgin before the blood moon the following night.

Rose falls for Martin and follows him to a store where his daughter Sarah works, where she overhears him talking to Sarah about her. Christian's divining tools lead him to the same store, where he thinks he has been led to Sarah, and he gets ahold of some of her hair. That night, Christian uses the hair in an incantation that renders Sarah motionless and floating in midair, causing Martin to panic and call Rose for help again. Rose decides against her better judgment to help Martin, informing him that waking someone who has been put under a Satanic spell will cause them to explode; she instead puts a holding spell on Sarah, keeping the spell from drawing her to the site of a sacrificial ritual. She realizes Martin has the ability to talk to ghosts, rendering him "talented" as well, and explains that they will need the ectoplasm of several different spirits to break the spell on Sarah.

Rose and Martin answer one of Rose's phone messages and exorcise a spirit from a garbage can by using Martin as a host for the spirit; when Rose commands the spirit to move on from this world, Martin spits up ectoplasm. Christian and Claudia, infuriated by the holding spell, witness this, and Christian calls Rose for a driving lesson, despite his fear of driving. During the lesson, Christian fails to overcome his fear, but obtains some of Rose's hair. Rose re-watches a tape from her father and remembers how her failure to control her abilities may have killed him; she goes to Martin's house and explains the accident. As a child, Rose assisted her father in helping a dog drowned in a haunted pothole to move on to the afterlife, but forgot part of the incantation, resulting in her father being possessed by both the dog and pothole and being hit by a bus. However, Martin convinces Rose to continue using her abilities to help Sarah, despite her worries that she might kill him by mistake.

Rose and Martin collect the ectoplasm of several different ghosts, but wind up one short of the total, forcing them to attempt to exorcise Bonnie from Martin's house. As they do, with the help of Rose's pregnant sister Sailor and her date Brian, Christian performs an incantation that breaks the holding spell on Sarah and weakens Rose's talents, leaving Martin still half-possessed by a furious Bonnie after expelling her ectoplasm. When they try to apply the ectoplasm to Sarah, they realize she is being drawn to the site of the ritual, and follow a magpie that has been following Rose ever since her father's accident. On the way, they find Christian also in Sarah's pursuit, and realize he is behind the ritual; Martin loses a finger trying to stop Christian's car.

At Christian's castle, Christian kills his wife after she interrupts his incantations, then prepares to sacrifice Sarah. Rose, Martin, Sailor, and Brian arrive too late to stop Christian from opening up a huge pit in his floor that sucks Sarah into it; Christian also fatally wounds the magpie. However, the pit expels Sarah, fully alive; the demon Astaroth rises from the pit and berates Christian for not bringing him a virgin, as everyone believed Sarah was. Astaroth decides to take Rose, an actual virgin, in Sarah's stead, but as she is dragged towards the pit, she convinces Martin to have sex with her on the floor to keep her from being a virgin anymore. As they do, Sailor goes into labor, Brian helps her deliver her baby, and Sarah knocks Christian into the pit, which closes as Rose and Martin climax. Bonnie tells Rose to treat Martin and Sarah well, then leaves Martin's body. Martin then allows himself to be a vessel for the dying magpie, which is revealed to be possessed by Rose and Sailor's father. He forgives Rose for the accident and welcomes Sailor's child, whom she names Vincent, before leaving Martin's body as well.

Three months later, Rose and Martin have started a paranormal investigations and services business. Martin proposes to Rose, who, shocked, responds with a cheerful "No!"

Cast
 Maeve Higgins as Rose Dooley
 Barry Ward as Martin Martin
 Will Forte as Christian Winter
 Claudia O'Doherty as Claudia Winter
 Jamie Beamish as Brian Welsh
 Terri Chandler as Sailor Dooley
 Risteárd Cooper as Vincent Dooley
 Emma Coleman as Sarah Martin
 Carrie Crowley as Marion Mularkey
 Mary McEvoy as Janet
 Agath Ellis as Young Rose
 Valerie O'Connor as Angela
 Siobhán McSweeney as Boring Noreen
 Eamon Morrissey as Mr. Daly
 Alison Spittle as Alison
 Jed Murray as Astaroth the Demon

Release
The film premiered at South by Southwest on March 10, 2019. The film was released in Ireland and the United Kingdom on September 13, 2019, by Wildcard Distribution. The film was released in the United States on March 6, 2020, by Cranked Up Films.

Reception
The site's consensus reads, "A horror/rom-com hybrid that somehow manages to blend its ingredients without losing their flavor, Extra Ordinary more than lives up to its title." On Metacritic the film has a weighted average score of 72 out of 100 based on reviews from 13 critics, indicating "generally favorable reviews."

Dennis Harvey of Variety wrote: "“Extra Ordinary” is a kind of tea-cosy Ghostbusters that’s consistently funny in a pleasingly off-kilter way."

Donald Clarke of The Irish Times gave the film 3 out of 5 and praised Higgins for her performance but suggests that the film may be overstuffed.
Chris Wasser of The Irish Independent gave the film 3 out of 5 and said it was "just as bonkers on screen as it is on paper" but it "eventually stretches itself beyond breaking point, bearing all the hallmarks of a surreal comedy sketch that got out of hand." Gareth O'Connor of Movies.ie gave the film a score of 3.5 out of 5. Stacy Grouden of Entertainment.ie gave the film a score of 4 out of 5.

Promotional video game
Airdorf Games, who had previously created a promotional video game for the 2019 horror film The Wind, created a browser game based on Extra Ordinary. The game is a collection of minigames that loosely follows the plot of the film, and, while short, was met with positive reception.

References

External links
 
 
 
 Page from Cranked Up Films

2019 films
2019 comedy films
2019 comedy horror films
Irish comedy horror films
Belgian comedy horror films
English-language Irish films
Films about exorcism
2010s English-language films